The Rengma Naga, are a Tibeto-Burman ethnic group inhabits the Northeast Indian states of Nagaland and Assam. According to the 2011 Census of India, the population of Rengmas in Nagaland stands at 62,951 and the population of Rengmas in Assam is around 22,000. Tseminyü District is the headquarters of the Rengmas in Nagaland and the headquarters of the Rengmas in Assam is located at Phentsero/Karenga Village.

History

According to the local traditions, the Rengmas and the Lothas (or Lhotas) were once part of a single ethnic group. There are also oral records of a mighty struggle between the combined Rengma villages, and the Lotha village of Phiro. There are records of the Rengmas' conflict with the Angami Nagas.

Slavery used to be a practice among the Rengmas, and the slaves were known by the names menugetenyu and itsakesa. By the time the British arrived in the Naga region, the slavery was a declining practice, and no Rengma appears to have been a slave during this time.

In Assam, the Rengma people are found in the Karbi-Anglong, the then Mikir Hills. The Rengmas migrated to the then Mikir Hills in the early part of 1800.  The migration of the Rengmas can be traced in the books written by JP Mills, ICS on the following:

In the book 'Travels in Assam' written by John Butler specifically mentioned on page number 126 that beyond the Kuleanee river the Rengmah (sic) boundary commences, and terminates with the Dhunseeree (sic) river, separating Now-Gong from the Seebsaghur (sic) district.

John Butler writes in 'Traves in Assam' on page number 121 that in 1839 Mr. Grange, Sub-Assistant Commissioner seems to have been the first European officer, who met the Rengma Naga in the vicinity of Mohung Dehooa, on his way to the Angami Hills. Butler opines that no revenue settlement was ever made or written agreement taken from them to pay the revenue, till February 1847. Mr. Sub-Assistant was deputed in December 1847, to enter the Rengma hills from Golaghat; but after visiting many villages, he found the country so heavy and impassable from the dense wet jungles and was forced to return to the plains at Kageerunga (sic). He again met the Rengma Naga and the first revenue settlement with the Rengma Naga villages discovered thirty-two in number and was successfully paid.

"The Rengma Nagas" written by JP Mills, MA, Indian Civil Service, Honorary Director of Ethnography Assam in 1936 in Introductory part in page 2 states, "About a hundred years ago or more a body of the western Rengmas migrated north-west to the Mikir Hills, where they are still living."

The book "The Lhota Nagas" written by JP Mills, ICS in 1922 in page xiv of the Introduction states, "Indeed it is now no longer quite clear whether this chief was a Lhota our a Rengma, and whether he protected against the pursuing Angamis the rearguard of the Lhotas crossing the Dayang northwards, or that of the Rengmas migrating westwards to the Mikir Hills....."

In page xix of the same book states, "The Rengmas thus migrated from the Kezami-Angami country, throwing out the Naked Rengmas eastwards to Melomi, and ultimately sending the bigger portion of the tribe westwards to the Mikir Hills."

The Rengmas claim that they are native or aborigines of Karbi-Anglong. Karbi oral history claim that they immigrated from the Yunnan region of China in ancient times. The Rengmas have come under pressure from militant factions, a hidden policy adopted by people between various ethnic groups interest and unity, and have retaliated by forming their own counter-militancy groupings, leading to ethnic killings and polarization in Karbi-Anglong, and the plight of both Karbis and Rengmas to relief camps. Parallel to the Rengmas, the Kukis, who have an anti-Naga tendency in the last few decades, also have militant groups active in Karbi-Anglong fighting for the rights of their ethnic group.

Subgroups
The Rengma Nagas are divided into two groups: the Eastern Rengmas and the Western Rengmas.

Economy
The Rengmas are experts in terrace cultivation.

Culture

Traditional clothing

The traditional Rengma clothing consists of various types of clothes, which are indicative of the status and position of the weavers. A man who has not been able to offer a great feast, or has never killed an enemy may wear an ordinary type of cloth called Rhikho. Rhikho is a white cloth with four narrow black bands. The number of black bands varies with the age of the wearer. Moyet tsu is another ordinary type of cloth, worn by the young men. It is a dark blue cloth with a very broad median band, and embroidered with a thin zigzag pattern in red at the edges. Alungtsu is a cloth for well-to-do men, who have not yet offered a great feast. Teri Phiketsu is a shawl, which requires the wearer to perform the head hunting ceremony.

Rengmas make yellow dye from the flowers of a tree, and also practice painting on clothes.

Ngada festival

The harvest festival of the Rengmas is called Ngada. It is an eight-day Ngada festival that marks the end of the agricultural season. Ngadah is celebrated just after the harvest, towards the end of November. The village high priest (Phesengu) announces the date of commencement of the festival.

The schedule of the festival is as follows:

During Ngadah, the Rengmas also perform a folk dance, with traditional warrior attire.

Other ethnic customs
The Rengma people bury their dead, and place the spear and the shield of the deceased in the grave. The funeral ceremonies end with lamentations and feasting.

References

Further reading
 
 

Stirn, Aglaja & Peter van Ham. The Hidden world of the Naga: Living Traditions in Northeast India. London: Prestel.
Oppitz, Michael, Thomas Kaiser, Alban von Stockhausen & Marion Wettstein. 2008. Naga Identities: Changing Local Cultures in the Northeast of India. Gent: Snoeck Publishers.
Kunz, Richard & Vibha Joshi. 2008. Naga – A Forgotten Mountain Region Rediscovered. Basel: Merian.

Naga people